24 Hours of Le Mans Virtual an esports 24-hour automobile endurance race for Le Mans Prototype (LMP) and Le Mans Grand Touring Endurance (LMGTE) vehicles held on a simulated version of the Circuit de la Sarthe. The event has been conducted several times:
 2020 24 Hours of Le Mans Virtual
 2022 24 Hours of Le Mans Virtual

Virtual 2020
Esports competitions